The Sudarium of Oviedo, or Shroud of Oviedo, is a bloodstained piece of cloth measuring c. 84 x 53 cm (33 x 21 inches) kept in the Cámara Santa of the Cathedral of San Salvador, Oviedo, Spain. The Sudarium (Latin for sweat cloth) is thought to be the cloth that was wrapped around the head of Jesus Christ after he died as described in John 20:6–7.

The cloth has been dated to around 700 AD by radiocarbon dating. However, at the same conference at which this information was presented, it was noted that in actuality the cloth has a definite history extending back to approximately 570 AD. The laboratory noted that later oil contamination could have resulted in the late dating.

The small chapel housing it was built specifically for the cloth by King Alfonso II of Asturias in AD 840; the Arca Santa is an elaborate reliquary chest with a Romanesque metal frontal for the storage of the Sudarium and other relics. The Sudarium is displayed to the public three times a year: Good Friday, the Feast of the Triumph of the Cross on 14 September, and its octave on 21 September.

Background and history

The Sudarium shows signs of advanced deterioration, with dark flecks that are symmetrically arranged but form no image, unlike the markings on the Shroud of Turin. Outside of the Bible the Sudarium is first mentioned in 570 AD by Antoninus of Piacenza, who writes that the Sudarium was being cared for in the vicinity of Jerusalem in a cave near the monastery of Saint Mark.

The Sudarium is presumed to have been taken from Palestine in 614 AD, after the invasion of the Byzantine provinces by the Sassanid Persian King Khosrau II. In order to avoid destruction in the invasion, it was taken away first to Alexandria by the presbyter Philip, then carried through northern Africa when Khosrau II conquered Alexandria in 616 AD and arrived in Spain shortly thereafter. The Sudarium entered Spain at Cartagena, along with people who were fleeing from the Persians. Fulgentius, bishop of Ecija, welcomed the refugees and the relics, and gave the chest containing the Sudarium to Leandro, bishop of Seville. He took it to Seville, where it spent some years.

In 657 it was moved to Toledo, then in 718 on to northern Spain to escape the advancing Moors. The Sudarium was hidden in the mountains of Asturias in a cave known as Montesacro until king Alfonso II, having battled back the Moors, built a chapel in Oviedo to house it in 840 AD.

On 14 March 1075, King Alfonso VI, his sister and Rodrigo Diaz Vivar (El Cid) opened the chest after days of fasting. The event was recorded on a document preserved in the Capitular Archives at the Cathedral of San Salvador in Oviedo. The king had the oak chest covered in silver with an inscription which reads, "The Sacred Sudarium of Our Lord Jesus Christ."

Comparison to the Shroud of Turin
For many years, various experts have argued as to whether the Sudarium and the Shroud of Turin have a linked history. Supporters of the Shroud's authenticity use the Sudarium's well-documented history as proof that the Shroud's radiocarbon dating is inaccurate and have looked for proof that the Sudarium and the Shroud were on the body of the same person, supposedly Jesus Christ. An Italian priest in the 1970's claimed that he noticed certain blood stains on the Sudarium that matched blood stains on the Shroud, in the same locations relative to the place on the head of the individual wrapped in the Shroud. Duke University Professor Alan D. Whanger did a similar study in the mid-1990's and claimed that he found over 20 matching blood stains on the Sudarium and the Shroud.

A forensic study of the Sudarium in 2015 at the University of Oviedo found traces of limestone dust on the Sudarium that were also found on the Shroud, in the same facial areas, and also supposedly came from Calvary in Jerusalem, where Jesus was crucified. This, along with comparisons of the blood stains on both cloths, led to a conclusion that both cloths were wrapped around the same person, in the same location.

In 2016, Dr. Juan Manuel Miñarro, a sculpture professor at the University of Seville, studied the faint, barely discernable facial markings of the Sudarium and compared them to the clearer facial markings on the Shroud, as well as the blood stains, and found the geometries to be very similar, concluding that the Sudarium and the Shroud were wrapped around the same deceased individual, though Miñarro wouldn't conclude that the individual was Jesus Christ.

See also

 Bilihildis, recipient of a sudarium
 Blood of Christ
 Empty tomb
 Relics associated with Jesus

References

Notes

Further reading
 
 
 
  (CC-BY-SA licensed on DOAJ)

External links
Viewing information
The Sudarium of Oviedo: Its History and Relationship to the Shroud of Turin
The Sudarium of Oviedo and what it Suggests about the Shroud of Turin
The Sudarium of Oviedo at Skeptical Spectacle
Decoding the Past: Relics of the Passion, 2005 History Channel video documentary
 Comparative Study of the Sudarium of Oviedo and the Shroud of Turin, 1998, paper presented at the "III Congresso Internazionale di Studi Sulla Sindone" in Turin.*

Relics associated with Jesus
Asturian culture
Kingdom of Asturias
Religion in Asturias